Robert Thaler (born October 15, 1959) is an American stage and television actor. He is known for playing Pearl Bradford in the American soap opera television series Santa Barbara.

Early life and education 
Thaler was born in Cedar Rapids, Iowa, where he was later raised in Marion, Iowa. He had a brother and two sisters. Thaler attended at University of California, Berkeley, where he earned a bachelor's degree in mathematics. Influenced by the Broadway play One Flew Over the Cuckoo's Nest, Thaler performed at regional theatres.

Career 
Thaler began his career in 1983, where he played the starring role of "Dancer" in the new ABC crime drama television series The Renegades.

While Thaler performed on regional theaters, he was seen by the creators Bridget and Jerome Dobson of the soap opera television series Santa Barbara, where they saw his performance on a Los Angeles play, titled, Tamara.  They created the role of Pearl Bradford for him. Thaler joined the cast of Santa Barbara in October 1985, where he was introduced as a wacky oddball waiter, helping "Cruz Castillo" (A Martinez) with his investigations. With his character on Santa Barbara, he revealed that the full name of the character was "Michael Baldwin Bradford III", when his character fell in love with "Eden Capwell" (Marcy Walker). His final appearance on Santa Barbara was from April 1988, in which Thaler later guest-starred on television programs including Hardcastle and McCormick, V, Remington Steele, T.J. Hooker and Hill Street Blues.

Filmography

Film

Television

References

External links 

Rotten Tomatoes profile

1959 births
Living people
People from Cedar Rapids, Iowa
Male actors from Iowa
American male television actors
American male stage actors
American soap opera actors
American male soap opera actors
20th-century American male actors
University of California, Berkeley alumni